Färna (or "Färna + Bäck") is a village situated in Skinnskatteberg Municipality, Västmanland County, Sweden with 145 inhabitants in 2010.

References 

Populated places in Västmanland County
Populated places in Skinnskatteberg Municipality